The 2023 Vegas Vipers season is the second season for the Vegas Vipers as a professional American football franchise. They are charter members of the XFL, one of eight teams to compete in the league for the 2023 season. The Vipers will play their home games at the Cashman Field and be led by head coach Rod Woodson.

The Vipers had changed their franchise name from Tampa Bay Vipers to the Vegas Vipers prior to the 2023 season. The franchise also relocated the team from Tampa, Florida to Las Vegas, Nevada.

On March 10, Offensive Coordinating Duane Taylor was relieved of his duties.

Schedule
All times Pacific

Game summaries

Week 1: at Arlington Renegades

Week 2: vs DC Defenders

Week 3: vs Seattle Sea Dragons
{{Americanfootballbox
|titlestyle=;text-align:center;
|state=autocollapse
|title=Week 3: Seattle Sea Dragons at Vegas Vipers – Game summary
|date=
|time=4:00 p.m. PDT
|road=Sea Dragons
|R1=6|R2=3|R3=6|R4=15
|home=Vipers
|H1=6|H2=3|H3=11|H4=6
|stadium=Cashman Field, Las Vegas, Nevada 
|attendance=6,037
|weather=
|referee=Reggie Smith
|TV=FX
|TVAnnouncers=Matt Barrie, Joey Galloway, and Tiffany Blackmon
|reference=
|scoring=

First quarter
 VGS – Jeff Badet 12-yard pass from Brett Hundley (2-pt Conversion No Good), 10:20. Vipers 6–0. Drive: 6 Plays, 25 Yards, 2:40. 
 SEA – Blake Jackson 26-yard pass from Ben DiNucci (3-pt Conversion No Good), 1:32. Tied 6–6. Drive: 7 Plays, 91 Yards, 3:47. 

Second quarter
 VGS – Bailey Giffen 39-yard field goal, 7:38. Vipers 9–6. Drive: 8 Plays, 53 Yards, 4:11.
 SEA – Dominik Eberle 34-yard field goal, 1:55. Tied 9–9. Drive: 6 Plays, 49 Yards, 2:10.Third quarter 
 VGS – Brett Hundley 6-yard rush (2-pt Conversion Good by Martavis Bryant), 12:06. Vipers 17–9. Drive: 6 Plays, 75 Yards, 2:54. VGS – Bailey Giffen 47-yard field goal, 6:24. Vipers 20–9. Drive: 8 Plays, 30 Yards, 3:18. SEA – Josh Gordon 16-yard pass from Ben DiNucci (3-pt Conversion No Good), 1:17. Vipers 20–15. Drive: 9 Plays, 82 Yards, 5:07.Fourth quarter
 SEA – Dominik Eberle 32-yard field goal, 7:06. Vipers 20–18. Drive: 10 Plays, 55 Yards, 5:28. VGS – John Lovett 50-yard pass from Brett Hundley (2-pt Conversion No Good), 6:45. Vipers 26–18. Drive: 1 Play, 50 Yards, 0:21. SEA – Juwan Green 22-yard pass from Ben DiNucci (3-pt Conversion No Good), 3:36. Vipers 26–24. Drive: 6 Plays, 73 Yards, 3:09. SEA – Josh Gordon 65-yard pass from Ben DiNucci (3-pt Conversion No Good), 1:00. Sea Dragons 30–26. Drive: 4 Plays, 73 Yards, 0:43.|stats=

Top passers
 SEA – Ben DiNucci – 29/37, 377 yards, 4 TD
 VGS – Brett Hundley – 13/28, 224 yards, 2 TD

Top rushers
 SEA – Morgan Ellison – 17 rushes, 103 yards 
 VGS – Rod Smith – 10 rushes, 41 yards

Top receivers
 SEA – Jahcour Pearson – 7 receptions, 99 yards
 VGS – Jeff Badet – 4 receptions, 93 yards
}}

Week 4: at DC Defenders

Week 5: vs. Orlando Guardians

Week 6: vs. St. Louis BattleHawks

Standings

Staff*Offensive Coordinator Duane Taylor Fired after Week 3  Wide Receivers coach Ray Sherman took over Play Calling Duties''

Roster

References

Vegas
Vegas Vipers
Vegas Vipers